Olga Larionova (born 1935) is the pen name of Olga Nikolayevna Tideman, a Russian science fiction author who began in the Soviet era. Her debut novel was A Leopard from the top of Kilimanjaro ("Леопард с вершины Килиманджаро") from 1965. Her story A Tale of Kings was in the anthology Earth and Elsewhere, which gained her notice in the West. She is one of the few successful female Russian science fiction writers of her generation. She won the Aelita Prize in 1987 and remains one of the few women to win it as an individual writer.

References

External links 

Soviet science fiction writers
Russian science fiction writers
1935 births
Living people
Women science fiction and fantasy writers